Andrei Nikolayevich Paliy (13 February 1971 – 20 March 2022) was a Russian naval officer who served as the deputy commander of the Black Sea Fleet. He was killed in combat in the Battle of Mariupol during the Russian invasion of Ukraine.

Biography
Paliy was born in Kyiv on 13 February 1971. In 1993, he chose not to be part of the Ukrainian armed forces and joined the Russian Northern Fleet.

He served on the battlecruiser Pyotr Velikiy.

Paliy was also involved in the Russo-Georgian War and the Russian intervention in Syria, according to media sources in Russia.

After the Russian annexation of Crimea, Paliy worked for the Russian naval academy in Sevastopol.

He reached the rank of captain 1st rank and served as the deputy commander of the Black Sea Fleet. According to Kommersant, he became deputy commander in 2019.

He was killed in combat on 20 March 2022 in the Battle of Mariupol during the Russian invasion of Ukraine. A funeral was held in Sevastopol on 23 March 2022.

See also
 Casualties of the Russo-Ukrainian War
 List of Russian generals killed during the 2022 invasion of Ukraine

References

1971 births
2022 deaths
Military personnel from Kyiv
Russian people of Ukrainian descent
Russian Navy personnel
People of the Russo-Georgian War
Russian military personnel killed in the 2022 Russian invasion of Ukraine
Siege of Mariupol
Russians in Ukraine